Stéphane Proulx (December 12, 1965 – November 21, 1993) was a Canadian racing driver.

Early life
Proulx was born in Sainte-Adèle, Quebec. His mother, Monique, was a Formula Atlantic driver in the 1970s and was one of the first women to be sponsored by a cigarette company. She gave up racing to support the career of her son.

Career
Stéphane won the 1987 Canadian Formula Ford 2000 Championship driving a Reynard 87SF for the Spenard-David Racing School. In 9 races he won 6, took 3 pole positions and finished on the podium in every race.

In 1989 he made the step up to Formula 3000, joining GA Motorsport bringing his Player's Ltd sponsorship with him. He drove a Lola T89/50 Cosworth DFV but had a difficult season adjusting to the power and to the new circuits. He finished 5th at Le Mans and finished the season 17th in the Championship with 2 points.

In 1990 he stayed in Formula 3000 but switched to Pacific Racing. Pacific had lost their sponsorship from Philip Morris and so Stéphane's Player's Ltd funding was a welcome addition. Proulx was competitive but he failed to capitalise on it. A 12th at Donington was followed by accidents at Silverstone, Pau, Jerez, Monza and Enna-Pergusa. 10th at Hockenheim in a rare finish was followed by gearbox failure at Brands Hatch. After two more accidents at Birmingham and Le Mans, he finished 7th at Nogaro in the final round.

In 1991 Proulx came back to Canada and drove a Swift tuned by Mauro Lanaro in the Canadian rounds of the IMSA Molson Formula Atlantic series, being declared the Canadian Formula Atlantic Champion, after a win in the last round at Vancouver.

In 1992 he competed in five rounds of the French F3 Championship driving a Dallara F392 Alfa Romeo for Formula Project Racing.

Later life
On April 3, 1993, while participating in a Formula Atlantic race at Phoenix International Raceway, Proulx was hit on head by a wheel lost by another competitor. He sustained head injuries from which he never recovered. Proulx died of complications resulting from HIV-related illness on November 21, 1993, in Sainte-Adèle.

References

External links
 Stéphane Proulx, F3000 - The AUTOSPORT Bulletin Board
 
 Stéphane Proulx, Motorsport Memorial

International Formula 3000 drivers
Racing drivers from Quebec
1993 deaths
AIDS-related deaths in Canada
Atlantic Championship drivers
People from Laurentides
1965 births